Bishop Benedict, Duke of Finland (1254 – 25 May 1291) was a Swedish prelate bishop and duke.

Early life
Bengt Birgersson was a member of the House of Bjelbo (Folkungaätten).
He was the youngest son of  Birger Magnusson (Birger Jarl), de facto ruler of Sweden from 1250 to 1266. His mother was Princess Ingeborg of Sweden, daughter of Eric X of Sweden and sister of King Eric XI of Sweden.
 
Two of his brothers, Valdemar and Magnus III, later became kings of Sweden.

Career 
He pursued an ecclesiastical career. While he was Archdeacon of Linköping Cathedral, he became chancellor to his brother, King Magnus.
In 1284, some time after the death of his next-elder brother Eric of Småland, and during the reign of Magnus, he was made Duke of Finland. He was the first known holder of that title and appanage.  In 1286 he was elected Bishop of Linköping. Linköping's chronicle of bishops from 1523 tells of him: "Scriptores rerum suecicarum medii ævi". There exist at least two of his wills, from 1287 and 1289. He died from the plague.

Ancestry

References

1254 births
1291 deaths
House of Bjelbo
Benedict 1254
People of medieval Finland
13th-century Roman Catholic bishops in Sweden
13th-century deaths from plague (disease)